The following radio stations broadcast on AM frequency 1360 kHz: 1360 AM is a regional broadcast frequency. Class B and D stations broadcast on 1360 AM.

Argentina
 AM 1360 in Maria Grande, Entre Rios (still have no callsign assigned)

Mexico

 XEDI-AM in Chihuahua City, Chihuahua
 XEZON-AM in Zongolica, Veracruz

United States

References

Lists of radio stations by frequency